Orós Alto is a locality situated in the municipality of Biescas. It is located 835 metres above sea level in Alto Gállego, Huesca, Aragon, Spain. In 2019, the locality had a population of 20 inhabitants.

References 

Municipalities in the Province of Huesca